GayBlade is an action role-playing video game developed by Ryan Best and released in 1992. Among the earliest of LGBT-themed video games (preceded in 1989 by Caper in the Castro), and long considered lost, a recovery effort by the LGBTQ Video Game Archive resulted in a playable emulation in 2020.

Premise

The player battles hordes of homophobic enemies, including rednecks and skinheads in order to rescue Empress Nelda and return her to Castle Gaykeep. The final boss of the game is paleoconservative political commentator Pat Buchanan, the era's most notorious opponent of gay rights.

Legacy
The 2020 Netflix documentary series High Score featured Ryan Best and GayBlade in its third episode, about early RPGs. At the time of production in 2019, Best had lost all copies during a move from Hawaii to San Francisco years before and had been looking for any since then, which he had told the show's producers. As part of their research, the production team searched online, including contacting the LGBTQ Video Game Archive, to seek out footage and copies. Best had found a long-lost copy before Rainbow Arcade closed in May 2019 and subsequently worked with an archivist from the Computerspiele Museum (Computer Game Museum) in Berlin, the LGBTQ Video Game Archive, The Strong National Museum of Play and the Internet Archive to preserve the game and provide the game in both an emulated form and as a downloadable version.

Bibliography

References

External link
GayBlade at Internet Archive

1992 video games
LGBT-related video games
Classic Mac OS games
Video games developed in the United States
Action role-playing video games
Fantasy video games
Windows games
Pat Buchanan
Role-playing video games